The Sumbar (also Sari-su, Sara-su and Ṣáríṣú) is a fast flowing river in southern Turkmenistan and northern Iran. It a tributary of the Atrek.  The name Sari-su means yellow water in Turkic languages, but is applied to a number of other rivers as well. It used to be an area for Caspian tigers in Turkmenistan, until the last individual was killed in January 1954.

Geography
It arises in the Kopet Dag mountains in Iran and flows into Turkmenistan. For a long stretch before the Sumbar runs into the Atrek, it is separated from it by a range of hills called the Marábeh.

See also 
 Chandyr River
 Battle of Geok Tepe (1879)

Notes

References
This article includes content derived from the article "Сумбар"  in the Great Soviet Encyclopedia, 1969–1978.

Rivers of Turkmenistan
International rivers of Asia
Rivers of Iran
Caspian Sea basin